Eupithecia trita is a moth in the family Geometridae. It is found in Libya.

References

Moths described in 1926
trita
Moths of Africa